Microcanus minor is a species of beetle in the family Cerambycidae, and the only species in the genus Microcanus. It was described by Henry Walter Bates in 1885.

References

Onciderini
Beetles described in 1885